Military robots are autonomous robots or remote-controlled mobile robots designed for military applications, from transport to search & rescue and attack.

Some such systems are currently in use, and many are under development.

History

Broadly defined, military robots date back to World War II and the Cold War in the form of the German Goliath tracked mines and the Soviet teletanks. The MQB-1 Predator drone was when "CIA officers began to see the first practical returns on their decade-old fantasy of using aerial robots to collect intelligence".

The use of robots in warfare, although traditionally a topic for science fiction, is being researched as a possible future means of fighting wars. Already several military robots have been developed by various armies. Some believe the future of modern warfare will be fought by automated weapons systems. The U.S. military is investing heavily in the RQ-1 Predator, which can be armed with air-to-ground missiles and remotely operated from a command center in reconnaissance roles. DARPA has hosted competitions in 2004 & 2005 to involve private companies and universities to develop unmanned ground vehicles to navigate through rough terrain in the Mojave Desert for a final prize of 2 million.

Artillery has seen promising research with an experimental weapons system named "Dragon Fire II" which automates loading and ballistics calculations required for accurate predicted fire, providing a 12-second response time to fire support requests. However, military weapons are prevented from being fully autonomous; they require human input at certain intervention points to ensure that targets are not within restricted fire areas as defined by Geneva Conventions for the laws of war.

There have been some developments towards developing autonomous fighter jets and bombers. The use of autonomous fighters and bombers to destroy enemy targets is especially promising because of the lack of training required for robotic pilots, autonomous planes are capable of performing maneuvers which could not otherwise be done with human pilots (due to high amount of G-force), plane designs do not require a life support system, and a loss of a plane does not mean a loss of a pilot. However, the largest drawback to robotics is their inability to accommodate for non-standard conditions. Advances in artificial intelligence in the near future may help to rectify this.

In 2020 a Kargu 2 drone hunted down and attacked a human target in Libya, according to a report from the UN Security Council’s Panel of Experts on Libya, published in March 2021. This may have been the first time an autonomous killer robot armed with lethal weaponry attacked human beings.

Examples

In current use

 D9T Panda, Israel
 Elbit Hermes 450, Israel
 Goalkeeper CIWS
 Guardium
 IAIO Fotros, Iran
 PackBot
 MQ-9 Reaper
 MQ-1 Predator
 TALON
 Samsung SGR-A1
 Shahed 129, Iran
 Baykar Bayraktar TB2, Turkey
 Shomer Gvouloth ("Border Keeper"), Israel
 THeMIS, Estonia
 PLA robot soldiers, deployed on the China-India border

In development
 
US Mechatronics has produced a working automated sentry gun and is currently developing it further for commercial and military use.
, a four-wheeled robot outfitted with several cameras, radar, and possibly a firearm, that automatically performs random or preprogrammed patrols around a military base or other government installation. It alerts a human overseer when it detects movement in unauthorized areas, or other programmed conditions. The operator can then instruct the robot to ignore the event, or take over remote control to deal with an intruder, or to get better camera views of an emergency. The robot would also regularly scan radio frequency identification tags (RFID) placed on stored inventory as it passed and report any missing items.
Tactical Autonomous Combatant (TAC) units, described in Project Alpha study Unmanned Effects: Taking the Human out of the Loop.
Autonomous Rotorcraft Sniper System is an experimental robotic weapons system being developed by the U.S. Army since 2005. It consists of a remotely operated sniper rifle attached to an unmanned autonomous helicopter. It is intended for use in urban combat or for several other missions requiring snipers. Flight tests are scheduled to begin in summer 2009.
 The "Mobile Autonomous Robot Software" research program was started in December 2003 by the Pentagon who purchased 15 Segways in an attempt to develop more advanced military robots. The program was part of a $26 million Pentagon program to develop software for autonomous systems.

 ACER
 Atlas (robot)
 Battlefield Extraction-Assist Robot
 Dassault nEUROn (French UCAV)
 Dragon Runner
 MATILDA
 MULE (US UGV)
 R-Gator
 Ripsaw MS1 
 SUGV
 Syrano
 iRobot Warrior
 PETMAN
 Excalibur unmanned aerial vehicle

Effects and impact

Advantages
Autonomous robotics would save and preserve soldiers' lives by removing serving soldiers, who might otherwise be killed, from the battlefield. Lt. Gen. Richard Lynch of the United States Army Installation Management Command and assistant Army chief of staff for installation stated at a 2011 conference:

Major Kenneth Rose of the US Army's Training and Doctrine Command outlined some of the advantages of robotic technology in warfare:

Increasing attention is also paid to how to make the robots more autonomous, with a view of eventually allowing them to operate on their own for extended periods of time, possibly behind enemy lines. For such functions, systems like the Energetically Autonomous Tactical Robot are being tried, which is intended to gain its own energy by foraging for plant matter. The majority of military robots are tele-operated and not equipped with weapons; they are used for reconnaissance, surveillance, sniper detection, neutralizing explosive devices, etc. Current robots that are equipped with weapons are tele-operated so they are not capable of taking lives autonomously. Advantages regarding the lack of emotion and passion in robotic combat is also taken into consideration as a beneficial factor in significantly reducing instances of unethical behavior in wartime. Autonomous machines are created not to be "truly 'ethical' robots", yet ones that comply with the laws of war (LOW) and rules of engagement (ROE). Hence the fatigue, stress, emotion, adrenaline, etc. that affect a human soldier's rash decisions are removed; there will be no effect on the battlefield caused by the decisions made by the individual.

Risks

Human rights groups and NGOs such as Human Rights Watch and the Campaign to Stop Killer Robots have started urging governments and the United Nations to issue policy to outlaw the development of so-called "lethal autonomous weapons systems" (LAWS). The United Kingdom opposed such campaigns, with the Foreign Office declaring that  "international humanitarian law already provides sufficient regulation for this area".

In July 2015, over 1,000 experts in artificial intelligence signed a letter calling for a ban on autonomous weapons. The letter was presented in Buenos Aires at the 24th International Joint Conference on Artificial Intelligence (IJCAI-15) and was co-signed by Stephen Hawking, Elon Musk, Steve Wozniak, Noam Chomsky, Skype co-founder Jaan Tallinn and Google DeepMind co-founder Demis Hassabis, among others.

Psychology
American soldiers have been known to name the robots that serve alongside them. These names are often in honor of human friends, family, celebrities, pets, or are eponymic. The 'gender' assigned to the robot may be related to the marital status of its operator.

Some affixed fictitious medals to battle-hardened robots, and even held funerals for destroyed robots. An interview of 23 explosive ordnance detection members shows that while they feel it is better to lose a robot than a human, they also felt anger and a sense of loss if they were destroyed. A survey of 746 people in the military showed that 80% either 'liked' or 'loved' their military robots, with more affection being shown towards ground rather than aerial robots. Surviving dangerous combat situations together increased the level of bonding between soldier and robot, and current and future advances in artificial intelligence may further intensify the bond with the military robots.

In fictional media

Pictures

See also

Lethal autonomous weapon
Robot combat
Unmanned combat air vehicle
US battlefield UAVs
Powered exoskeleton
Network-centric warfare
Missile guidance
DARPA Grand Challenge
Multi Autonomous Ground-robotic International Challenge
Roboethics
Telerobotics
Three Laws of Robotics
Supersoldier
Robot Wars (disambiguation)

References

External links

 "Biomass military robot in development"
 EATR: Energetically Autonomous Tactical Robot - Phase II Project

Ethical and legal concerns 
 Gerhard Dabringer (Hg.), Ethica Themen: Ethical and Legal Aspects of Unmanned Systems. Interviews, Wien 2010
 Public Say It's Illegal to Target Americans Abroad as Some Question CIA Drone Attacks, according to Fairleigh Dickinson University PublicMind poll - February 7, 2013
The future of warfare: Why we should all be very afraid (2014-07-21), Rory Tolan, Salon
 Archive on air wars, Geographical Imaginations
 Logical Limitations to Machine Ethics, with Consequences to Lethal Autonomous Weapons. Also discussed in: Does the Halting Problem Mean No Moral Robots? 
 Robots in War: Issues of Risk and Ethics - 2009

Organizations
 United States Joint Forces Command website: "Leading the transformation of the U.S. military"
 irobot.com, builder of the PackBot and the R-Gator systems
 Boston Dynamics, builder of BigDog

News articles/press releases
 USJFC: 'Robotics to play major role in future warfighting'
 "From bomb disposal to waste disposal"  Robots help deal with hazards, emergencies and disasters (International Electrotechnical Commission, July 2011)
 "War robots still in Iraq", DailyTech, April 17, 2008
 New Model Army Soldier Rolls Closer to Battle (SWORDS)
 TALON Small Mobile Robot
 TWG Military Robots
 Carnegie Mellon University's snooping robot going to Iraq
 PackBot Battlefield robotic Platform 
 Miniature Unmanned Aerial Systems - UAV
 Guardium Autonomous Security Vehicle
 Unmanned Ground Systems from Israel 
 High-Tech Military in Due Course 
 Launching a new kind of warfare
 
As Wars End, Robot Field Faces Reboot April 11, 2012

Russian inventions
Soviet inventions
Weapons